The Kochenderfer Covered Bridge is a historic wooden covered bridge located at Saville Township in Perry County, Pennsylvania. It crosses Big Buffalo Creek. Its WGCB reference is 38-50-09.

It was listed on the National Register of Historic Places in 1980.

See also 
 National Register of Historic Places listings in Perry County, Pennsylvania

References 

Covered bridges on the National Register of Historic Places in Pennsylvania
Covered bridges in Perry County, Pennsylvania
Bridges completed in 1919
Wooden bridges in Pennsylvania
Bridges in Perry County, Pennsylvania
Tourist attractions in Perry County, Pennsylvania
National Register of Historic Places in Perry County, Pennsylvania
Road bridges on the National Register of Historic Places in Pennsylvania
Queen post truss bridges in the United States
King post truss bridges in the United States